Bhutanitis thaidina, commonly known as the Chinese three-tailed swallowtail, is a rare species of butterfly in the family Papilionidae.

The butterfly is found in Tibet and China. The larva feeds on Aristolochia Aristolochia moupinensis.

Subspecies
 B. t. thaidina
 B. t. dongchuaensis

References

External links
 
 
TOLweb.org: Taxonomic discussion of Bhutanitis thaidina

T
Butterflies of Asia
Fauna of Tibet
Taxa named by Émile Blanchard
Butterflies described in 1871